Ip Man: Kung Fu Master is a 2019 Chinese martial arts film co-written and directed by Li Liming and starring Dennis To as Ip Man. It is To's third portrayal of the Hong Kong martial artist, after The Legend Is Born: Ip Man (2010) and Kung Fu League (2018). The film depicts Ip Man's stint as a police officer in Guangzhou before the Chinese Communist Revolution in 1949.   The film did not get a theatrical release in China, but instead it was released digitally via streaming on Youku.

Cast
Dennis To as Ip Man
Yuan Li Ruoxin as Qing Chuan
Tong Xiaohu as Director Yuan
Yue Dongfeng as Qiao Wu
Chang Qinyuan as Cheung Wing-sing
Zhao Xiaoguang as Sasaki-Zuo
Ren Yu as Tokugawa
Li Rizhu as Ribby
Michael Wong as San Ye

Release
Ip Man was released in China digitally exclusively on Youku on 23 December 2019. The film was given a limited release in the United States on 11 December 2020.

The film will be available On Demand via Apple TV, Prime Video, Google Play, FandangoNOW, DirecTV, and more on March 9 throughout the United States.

Reception 

On Rotten Tomatoes, the film has an aggregated score of 36% based on 11 critic reviews.

References

External links

2019 films
2019 martial arts films
Biographical action films
Depictions of Ip Man on film
Films about police officers
Films set in Guangzhou
Films set in the 1940s
Kung fu films
2010s Hong Kong films